The 1904 United States presidential election in Vermont took place on November 8, 1904 as part of the 1904 United States presidential election. Voters chose four representatives, or electors to the Electoral College, who voted for president and vice president.

Vermont overwhelmingly voted for the Republican nominee, President Theodore Roosevelt, over the Democratic nominee, former Chief Judge of New York Court of Appeals Alton B. Parker. Roosevelt won Vermont by a landslide margin of 59.13%.

With 77.97% of the popular vote, Vermont would be Roosevelt's strongest victory in terms of percentage of the popular vote.

Results

Results by county

See also
 United States presidential elections in Vermont

Notes

References

Vermont
1904
1904 Vermont elections